Lee Seung-gi (born January 13, 1987) is a South Korean singer, actor, host and entertainer. This is a list of awards and nominations received by Lee.

Awards and nominations

Music awards

Film and television awards

Other accolades

State and cultural honors

Listicles

References 

Lee Seung-gi
Lee Seung-gi